John Forsyth Sr. (October 22, 1780October 21, 1841) was a 19th-century American politician from Georgia. He represented the state in both the House of Representatives and the Senate, and also served as the 33rd Governor of Georgia. As a supporter of the policies of President Andrew Jackson, Forsyth was appointed the 13th United States Secretary of State by Jackson in 1834, and continued in that role until 1841 during the presidency of Martin Van Buren. He also served as US Minister to Spain during the presidency of James Monroe.

Early life
Forsyth was born in Fredericksburg, Virginia. His father, Robert Forsyth, a Scottish immigrant, was the first U.S. Marshal to be killed in the line of duty in 1794. He was an attorney who graduated from the College of New Jersey (now Princeton University) in 1799. He married Clara Meigs, daughter of Josiah Meigs, in 1801. One of his sons, John Forsyth, Jr., later became a newspaper editor.

Political life
Forsyth served in the United States House of Representatives (1813–1818 and 1823–1827), the United States Senate (1818–1819 and 1829–1834), and as the 33rd Governor of Georgia (1827–1829). He was the United States Secretary of State from 1834 until 1841. In this role he led the government's response to the Amistad case. He was a loyal follower of Andrew Jackson and opposed John C. Calhoun in the issue of nullification. Forsyth was appointed as Secretary of State in reward for his efforts. He led the pro-removal reply to Theodore Frelinghuysen about the Indian Removal Act of 1830. He supported slavery and was a slaveholder himself.

Death and legacy
Forsyth died in Washington, D.C., and was buried in Congressional Cemetery. Forsyth County, Georgia, Forsyth, Georgia, and Forsyth Park in Savannah are named for him. He died the day before his 61st birthday.

In popular culture
In the 1997 Steven Spielberg movie, Amistad, Forsyth was played by character actor David Paymer.

Notes

References

External links
 
 
 Biography at Players in the Amistad Affair
 Letter, 1825 Mar. 5, Washington, [D.C. to] G[eorge] M. Troup, [Governor of Georgia] / John Forsyth
 [Letter] 1826 June 15, Sand Hills, [Georgia] / John Forsyth
 [Letter] 1827 Dec 12, Milledgeville, Georgia, [to Governor] of Tennessee, Sam[ue]l Houston / John Forsyth, Gov[ernor of Georgia]
 [Letter] 1830 Jan 24, Georgetown, District of Columbia [to] George R. Gilmer, Governor of Georgia / John Forsyth

|-

|-

|-

|-

|-

|-

|-

|-

|-

|-

|-

|-

1780 births
1841 deaths
Ambassadors of the United States to Spain
Burials at the Congressional Cemetery
Democratic Party United States senators from Georgia (U.S. state)
Democratic-Republican Party United States senators
Georgia (U.S. state) Attorneys General
Democratic Party governors of Georgia (U.S. state)
Jackson administration cabinet members
Democratic Party members of the Georgia House of Representatives
Politicians from Fredericksburg, Virginia
Princeton University alumni
United States Secretaries of State
Van Buren administration cabinet members
Democratic-Republican Party state governors of the United States
19th-century American diplomats
Democratic-Republican Party members of the United States House of Representatives from Georgia (U.S. state)
Jacksonian members of the United States House of Representatives from Georgia (U.S. state)
American slave owners
19th-century American politicians
La Amistad
Chairmen of the Senate Committee on Foreign Relations
United States senators who owned slaves